The Garrapatas Fault (Zone) is an inactive dextral oblique thrust fault in the departments of Chocó and Valle del Cauca in Colombia.

Etymology 
The fault is named after the Garrapatas River.

Description 
The Garrapatas Fault runs between the axis of the Western Ranges of the Colombian Andes and the Serranía de Los Paraguas, to the west of the city of Buga. The fault displaces oceanic volcanic and sedimentary rocks and has a very well developed V-shaped valley along the upper parts of the Garrapatas and Las Vueltas Rivers and probably connects with the Argelia Fault. It causes alignment of drainage and parallel streams. Dextral movement in this fault is an exception to the common sinistral (left-lateral) movement of north-south trending faults in the region.

See also 

 List of earthquakes in Colombia
 Romeral Fault System

References

Bibliography

Maps 
 

Seismic faults of Colombia
Thrust faults
Strike-slip faults
Inactive faults
Faults
Faults